Mommy Elvie's Problematic Show was a comedy show hosted by Ariel Villasanta's (co-host of Totoo TV and The Misadventures of Maverick and Ariel) mother, Elvie Villasanta that aired every Tuesday evenings on ABC 5.

Plot
Mommy Elvie wants to be famous before she turns 80 with the help of her son Ariel.

Cast
Elvie Villasanta
Ariel Villasanta

Guests
Kiko Machine
Long Mejia
Nicole Hyala of 90.7 Love Radio

Trivia
Mommy Elvie also appeared in her son's former show, The Misadventures of Maverick and Ariel, that also aired on ABC.
This show also currently airs worldwide on ABS-CBN's TFC on Kapamilya Channel

See also
List of programs aired by TV5 (Philippine TV network)

TV5 (Philippine TV network) original programming
Philippine comedy television series
2007 Philippine television series debuts
2008 Philippine television series endings
Filipino-language television shows